Susan Anne Ridley Sedgwick (1788–1867) was a 19th-century American writer specializing in children's novels. She also painted a watercolor-on-ivory portrait of an ex-slave who came to work for her family.

Sedgwick was born in Stockbridge, Massachusetts, daughter of Matthew Ridley (1746–1789) and Catherine Livingston (1751–1813), his second wife. Sedgwick's mother, Catherine Livingston, was the daughter of William Livingston, governor of New Jersey. She married Theodore Sedgwick Jr., (1780–1839). Her husband's father, Theodore Sedgwick (1746–1813), was a delegate to Continental Congress, a United States Representative, Speaker of the U.S. House of Representatives, a United States Senator from Massachusetts, and a state supreme court judge. As a lawyer, Sedgwick, Sr. represented Elizabeth ("Mumbet") Freeman, who had been a slave for forty years, and won her freedom. Mumbet came to live as a servant in the Sedgwick household, and Susan Sedgwick painted her portrait (watercolor on ivory).

Sedgwick's sister-in-law was Catharine Sedgwick (1789–1867), also a novelist. Before she married Catharine's brother, Susan was Catharine's schoolmate.

Sedgwick was one of the 139 people buried in the large circular family burial plot in Stockbridge, Massachusetts known as the Sedgwick Pie.

Works

References

External links 
 
 
 Sedgwick Family Papers

1788 births
1867 deaths
American children's writers
American people of Dutch descent
American people of Scottish descent
Livingston family
Writers from Massachusetts
Sedgwick family